Iago López may refer to:
 Iago López (sailor)
 Iago López (footballer)